The Lizard Range is a mountain range southeast of Fernie, British Columbia in the Canadian Rockies. The range is home to the Fernie Alpine Resort and parts of the Mount Fernie Provincial Park.

The range is located north of the Kootenay River and the Rocky Mountain Trench, south of Lizard Creek, west of the Elk River and east of the Bull River.

See also
 Ranges of the Canadian Rockies

References

Ranges of the Canadian Rockies
Mountain ranges of British Columbia
Two-thousanders of British Columbia